The Washington Agreement (Croatian: washingtonski sporazum and Bosnian: vašingtonski sporazum) was a ceasefire agreement between the Republic of Bosnia and Herzegovina and the Croatian Republic of Herzeg-Bosnia, signed in Washington, D.C. on 18 March 1994 and Vienna. It was signed by Bosnian Prime Minister Haris Silajdžić, Croatian Foreign Minister Mate Granić and President of Herzeg-Bosnia Krešimir Zubak. Under the agreement, the combined territory held by the Croat and Bosnian government forces was divided into ten autonomous cantons, establishing the Federation of Bosnia and Herzegovina and ending the Croat-Bosniak War. The cantonal system was selected to prevent dominance by one ethnic group over another.

The subsequently signed Washington Framework Agreement had the creation of a loose federation (or confederation) between Croatia and Federation of Bosnia and Herzegovina as one of its goals.



See also
 Federation of Bosnia and Herzegovina
 Republic of Bosnia and Herzegovina
 Croatian Republic of Herzeg-Bosnia
 Croat-Bosniak War
 Bosnian War
 Dayton agreement
 Split Agreement

References

Further reading
 Allcock, John B.,  Marko Milivojevic, et al. Conflict in the Former Yugoslavia: An Encyclopedia (1998)

External links
United States Institute of Peace: Washington Agreement
Uppsala Conflict Data Program: Washington Agreement
Office of the High Representative: Creation of Federation of BiH (1995-1999)

1994 in international relations
1994 in Bosnia and Herzegovina
1994 in Croatia
1994 in Austria
March 1994 events in the United States
1994 in Washington, D.C.
1990s in Vienna
Bosnian peace process
Bosnian War
Croatian War of Independence
Treaties of Bosnia and Herzegovina
Treaties of Croatia
History of the Federation of Bosnia and Herzegovina
Ceasefires
Peace treaties
Aftermath of war
Presidency of Bill Clinton
Alija Izetbegović
Bosnia and Herzegovina–Croatia relations
Austria–Bosnia and Herzegovina relations
Austria–Croatia relations
Austria–United States relations
Bosnia and Herzegovina–United States relations
Croatia–United States relations